The 1865 Newfoundland general election was held on 7 November 1865 to elect members of the 9th General Assembly of Newfoundland in Newfoundland Colony. The Conservative Party led by Frederick Carter formed the government.

Results by party

Elected members
 Twillingate-Fogo
 William V. Whiteway Conservative (speaker)
 Thomas Knight Conservative
 Bonavista Bay
 John H. Warren Conservative
 John T. Burton Conservative
 John T. Oakley Conservative
 Trinity Bay
 Stephen Rendell Conservative
 Stephen March Conservative
 Frederick J. Wyatt Conservative
 Bay de Verde
 John Bemister Conservative
 Carbonear
 John Rorke Conservative
 Harbour Grace
 John Hayward Conservative
 William S. Green Conservative
 Brigus-Port de Grave
 John Leamon Conservative
 Robert J. Pinsent elected later
 St. John's East
 John Kavanagh Opposition
 John Kent Conservative
 Robert J. Parsons Opposition
 St. John's West
 Henry Renouf Opposition
 Peter Brennan elected later
 John Casey Conservative
 Robert Alsop elected later
 Thomas Talbot Opposition
 Harbour Main
 George Hogsett Opposition
 Charles Furey Opposition
 Ferryland
 Thomas Glen Opposition
 Michael Kearney Opposition
 Placentia and St. Mary's
 Ambrose Shea Conservative
 Pierce M. Barron Conservative
 Thomas O'Reilly Conservative
 Burin
 F.B.T. Carter Conservative 
 Edward Evans Conservative
 Fortune Bay
 Thomas R. Bennett Conservative
 Burgeo-LaPoile
 D. W. Prowse Conservative

References 
 

1865
1865 elections in Canada
1865 elections in North America
Pre-Confederation Newfoundland
1865 in Newfoundland
November 1865 events